"Kitipun"  is a song by Dominican singer-songwriter Juan Luis Guerra. It was written by Guerra and released by Universal Music Latin on April 4, 2019 as the lead single from his fourteenth studio album, Literal. The song reached number one in Dominican Republic and Puerto Rico, as well as reached the top 10 in El Salvador, Panama and Venezuela, the top 20 in Guatemala and the top 30 in Ecuador. The song won Best Tropical Song at the 20th Latin Grammy Awards.

Charts

References 

2019 singles
Juan Luis Guerra songs
Latin Grammy Award for Best Tropical Song
2019 songs
Songs written by Juan Luis Guerra